The North River is a tributary of the Des Moines River in south-central Iowa in the United States. Via the Des Moines River, it is part of the watershed of the Mississippi River.

In Madison County, it collects a short tributary known as the North Branch North River.

See also
List of Iowa rivers

References

Rivers of Iowa
Bodies of water of Adair County, Iowa
Bodies of water of Guthrie County, Iowa
Bodies of water of Madison County, Iowa
Rivers of Polk County, Iowa
Bodies of water of Warren County, Iowa
Tributaries of the Des Moines River